Joey + Rory  was an American country and bluegrass duo composed of singer-songwriters Rory Lee Feek (born April 25, 1965) and Joey Feek (September 9, 1975 – March 4, 2016), who were husband and wife. Both members of the duo were vocalists and songwriters, with Rory also playing acoustic guitar. Rory Lee Feek had written singles for other artists prior to the duo's foundation. The duo was the third-place finalist on CMT's competition Can You Duet in 2008. The duo recorded eight studio albums for Vanguard Records and Gaither Music Group and charted three singles on Hot Country Songs.

History
Before the duo's foundation, Rory Lee Feek worked as a songwriter in Nashville, Tennessee, and continued to work as a songwriter as a member of Joey + Rory. Songs he wrote for other artists include Clay Walker's Top Five hit "The Chain of Love", Blake Shelton's Number One hit "Some Beach", Easton Corbin's "A Little More Country Than That", Blaine Larsen's 2005 hit, "How Do You Get That Lonely", and Jimmy Wayne's 2008 single "I Will". Rory also founded the independent label Giantslayer Records in 2004, on which Joey recorded a solo album entitled Strong Enough to Cry in 2005. This album was released in CD format and digital download in 2006. Rory also recorded a solo album on Giantslayer Records, titled My Ol' Man, which he made available only as a download.

Joey + Rory performed on the CMT competition Can You Duet in 2008, in which they were third-place finalists. Shortly after the competition, they were signed to the independent label Sugar Hill Records. They returned to the Can You Duet stage to perform "Cheater, Cheater" on "Original Song Night" for the series' second season, which aired on July 25, 2009.

2008–2009: The Life of a Song
The duo's debut album, The Life of a Song, was released on October 28, 2008, on Sugar Hill Records. The album debuted at No. 10 on the Billboard Top Country Albums chart, and No. 61 on the all-genre Billboard 200. Its lead-off single, "Cheater, Cheater", was originally recorded by the duo Bomshel. Kristy Osmonson, one-half of that duo, co-wrote the song with the Feeks and Wynn Varble. Bomshel's version was released as a single in early 2008, although it did not chart. Joey + Rory's version was released in September 2008, featuring a music video that included a cameo from Naomi Judd, who had been a judge on Can You Duet. Joey + Rory's version peaked at No. 30 on the country music charts in early 2009. The duo has also appeared in television commercials for the online retailer Overstock.com in late 2008. In February 2009, the duo was nominated for the Academy of Country Music Awards Top Vocal Duo. Although a cover of Lynyrd Skynyrd's "Free Bird" was originally to have been released as the second single, it was withdrawn after two weeks, and replaced in March 2009 with "Play the Song", which failed to chart. The album's third single, "To Say Goodbye", was released to radio on July 27, 2009, debuting at number 54 as Billboard Magazine's "Hot Shot Debut" on the "Hot Country Songs" chart.

Joey + Rory released their first holiday single, the Carl Jackson-produced "It's Christmas Time," on November 16, 2009, to country radio and November 24, 2009, to digital retailers. The single was released in partnership with CMT One Country, which donated a portion of proceeds from the single to various charities (including The Second Harvest Food Bank of Middle Tennessee). Additionally, Rory Feek, along with Tim Johnson, created the Song Trust, under which an album of Christmas songs performed by children, titled Merry Kidsmas, was released.

2010–2011: Album Number Two

Joey + Rory announced on October 15, 2009, that they were in the studio working on the follow-up album to The Life of a Song. The album, titled Album Number Two, was announced in January 2010 and released on September 14, 2010. The lead-off single, "This Song's for You", was released to radio in July 2010; originally "That's Important to Me" had been chosen, but the single choice was changed. The music video for "This Song's for You" was directed by Darren Doane and was released in August 2010. "That's Important to Me" was released as the album's second single in October 2010. It debuted at number 58 on the Hot Country Songs chart for the week ending February 12, 2011.

On March 16, 2010, it was announced that the duo were the winners of the 2010 Academy of Country Music Award for Top New Vocal Duo, and would compete alongside Luke Bryan and Gloriana for the Top New Artist award. Joey + Rory performed new songs from their upcoming album, were interviewed, and received their award on the GAC special "ACM Top New Artists" on April 1, 2010.

2011–2012: A Farmhouse Christmas and His and Hers
On August 29, 2011, Joey + Rory released a new single, titled "Headache," to country radio, though it failed to chart and was not included on an album. Joey + Rory released their first Christmas album, A Farmhouse Christmas, on October 11, 2011.

Joey + Rory's third studio album, His and Hers, was released on July 31, 2012. "When I'm Gone" and "Josephine" served as the album's first two singles and were simultaneously released to radio before the album, though neither charted. In late 2015, due to a spike in sales for "When I'm Gone" after the video was featured in some press about Joey + Rory, it managed to enter the Billboard Hot Country Songs chart at number 21.

2013–2016: Final recordings 
Joey + Rory announced on the red carpet of the ACM Awards that the duo had recorded their first album of gospel music. Joey Feek told Billboard that "It's kind of an inspirational album, of old gospel songs that I grew up singing and listening to my mom sing.... It’s an album I’ve wanted to do for a long, long time." The album, Inspired: Songs of Faith & Family, was released on July 16, 2013, via Gaither Music Group. It debuted at number 166 on the Billboard 200 with first-week sales of 3,000, while also peaking at number 31 on the Top Country Albums chart and at number 6 on the Top Christian Albums chart.

After the release of their Gospel album, Joey + Rory announced that they would be releasing their fifth studio album, Made to Last, in late 2013 via their own Farmhouse Recordings record label (their first self-released project). Made to Last was released on October 8, 2013, and debuted at No. 44 on the Top Country Albums chart. Their sixth studio album, Country Classics: A Tapestry of Our Musical Heritage, was released exclusively to Cracker Barrel in May 2014, with a wide release following on October 14, 2014. Their second project on Gaither Music Group, the record consists of cover versions of classic country songs.

Hymns That Are Important to Us, the duo's seventh and final studio album, was released on February 12, 2016, via Gaither Music Group. The set, which was a "dream project" for Joey Feek, consists of twelve covers of Christian hymns, plus a reprise of "When I'm Gone," which was first featured on the duo's His and Hers album in 2012. Some proceeds of the album's deluxe edition will go towards the Loeys-Dietz Syndrome Foundation, a charity selected by Joey Feek in honor of her daughter's friend who has Loeys-Dietz syndrome. Hymns That Are Important to Us debuted at the top of the Billboard Top Country Albums and Top Christian Albums charts, with first week sales of 68,000 copies, making it their highest-charting release and the duo's best sales week ever.

Rory Feek wrote and produced a film, Josephine, which was set in the American Civil War and included the couple's song of the same name. . It was shot at the Nathan Bedford Forrest Boyhood Home, the childhood home of Confederate General Nathan Bedford Forrest owned by the Sons of Confederate Veterans in Chapel Hill, Tennessee. The film later debuted at the Nashville Film Festival in summer 2016.

Joey was diagnosed with cervical cancer in late 2015 and died of the disease in March 2016, effectively disbanding Joey + Rory.

Discography

Studio albums

Holiday albums

Compilation albums

Singles

Music videos

Awards and nominations

References

External links

American bluegrass music groups
Country music groups from Tennessee
Country music duos
Male–female musical duos
Grammy Award winners
Vanguard Records artists
Musical groups established in 2008
Musical groups disestablished in 2016
Married couples